Robert Edward "Bob" Johnson (August 13, 1922 in Montgomery, Alabama – January 1996 in Chicago) was Associate Publisher and Executive Editor of JET Magazine.  He joined the JET staff in February 1953, two years after it was founded by Publisher John H. Johnson.  He was part of the Presidential Press Corps in 1972 that traveled with United States President Richard Nixon to Russia, Poland, Austria and Iran and traveled with Ambassador Andrew Young on a trade mission tour of Africa in 1979.  He was the author of Bill Cosby:In Words and Pictures.

Education
Morehouse College, 1948
Syracuse University, Masters of Journalism 1952

External links
 Find Articles Obituary

American magazine editors
1922 births
1996 deaths
20th-century American non-fiction writers
Morehouse College alumni